Caryn is a given name. Notable persons with that name include:

 Caryn Johnson (born 1955), better known by her stage name Whoopi Goldberg, African-American comedian and actress
 Caryn Kadavy (born 1967), American figure skater 
 Caryn Mower (born 1965), American actress, wrestler, and stunt performer
 Caryn Navy (born 1953),  American mathematician and computer scientist
 Caryn Richman (born 1956), American actress

See also
 Caren (disambiguation)
 Carin
 Karen (disambiguation)
 Karin (disambiguation)